Work Drugs is an American synth pop duo from Philadelphia, founded by Thomas Crystal and Benjamin Louisiana. It currently consists of Crystal (vocals and guitar), alongside Louisiana (vocals and keys), Jonas Ohh (drums), Mr. Kansas City (bass), and Katie Nicks (vocals and percussion). It band has had LPs released via boutique label Bobby Cahn Records and toured on the festival circuit in the United States, including SXSW and CMJ, as well as national support slots for the likes of Two Door Cinema Club, Umphrey's McGee, Maps and Atlases, Battles, Peter, Bjorn & John, Sun Airway, Memoryhouse, Parts and Labor, J.Viewz, and more.

History
Work Drugs is a Philadelphia based recording project started by Thomas Crystal and Benjamin Louisiana on the banks of the Delaware River.

Self-described as a band that "makes music specifically for boating, sexting, dancing, yachting, and living" or "Philadelphia's premier Bat Mitzvah and Quinceanera party band", Work Drugs' name was given by their friend Eduardo S. as they were sailing the Baja of Mexico. Band members Tom and Ben bonded together in sailing school over music, which is when they started composing songs for their first album. Their music has been compared with that of Steely Dan by the Guardian website.

Their earliest efforts arrived sporadically in the form of singles ("Third Wave", "Dog Daze" and "Rad Racer"). On June 27, 2011 the duo released their first album Summer Blood, which consisted of their first few singles and three acoustic recordings. Later that year they released their sophomore album Aurora Lies. The album, released on November 7, 2011, was the band's first release to bring a collection of entirely previously unreleased tracks. On July 10, 2012, Work Drugs resurfaced with their third album, Absolute Bearing.

In August 2011, the song "Rad Racer" was featured in the Urban Outfitters commercial for "Favorite Fall Jeans of 2011".
In his 2011 album, Still Sound, Xxyyxx included a remixed version of "Rad Racer".

Work Drugs have played live shows across North America in cities such as Boston, New York City, Chicago and San Francisco. In April 2011, the group supported Northern Ireland-based indie rock band Two Door Cinema Club and Chicago indie rock band Maps & Atlases on a tour of the West Coast of the United States.

In late 2011, Work Drugs supported Peter, Bjorn & John and Memoryhouse on their east coast tour through Philadelphia.

In February 2012, Work Drugs supported Umphrey's McGee on their east coast run through Boston, Philadelphia and Baltimore.

Discography

Studio albums

Extended plays

Remixes
 Little Scream – "The Heron and the Fox" (Work Drugs Remix) (2011 Secretly Canadian)
 Bon Iver - "Beth/Rest" (Work Drugs Remix) (2012 Jagjaguwar)

Singles
As a celebration of their first anniversary, Work Drugs released a collaborative single with Philly artist Dylan Sieh aka Tours called Dirty Dreams on 7 December 2011.

The track can be streamed here.

Track List: Summer Blood

All tracks can be streamed from here.

Track List: Aurora Lies

All tracks can be streamed from here.

Track List: Cayman Islands Sessions

All tracks can be streamed from here.

Track List: Absolute Bearing

All tracks can be streamed from here.

Track List: Delta

All tracks can be streamed from here.

Track List: Mavericks

All tracks can be streamed from here.

Track List: Insurgents

All tracks can be streamed from here.

Track List: Runaways

All tracks can be streamed from here.

Music videos

References

External links

 Official Website

American synth-pop groups
Indie pop groups from Pennsylvania
Musical groups established in 2011
Musicians from Philadelphia
2011 establishments in Pennsylvania